Saverio Santora (1935–1987), also known as "Sammy Black", was a New York mobster with the Genovese crime family who briefly served as family underboss.

In the late 1970s, Santora took over as caporegime of Antonio "Buckaloo" Ferro's powerful 116th Street crew in the East Harlem section of Manhattan. Santora quickly became one of the most powerful captains in the family. The crew was involved in illegal gambling, bookmaking, loan sharking, heroin trafficking, and labor racketeering within the Carpenters' Union.

In 1981, longtime Genovese boss Philip Lombardo went into semi-retirement.  Vincent "Chin" Gigante and Santora were the prime candidates to succeed Lombardo as boss, being two of the most respected and influential members of the family. Lombardo made Gigante the boss and Santora the underboss. Santora continued as underboss of the family until his death in 1987.

Current Genovese boss Liborio Bellomo was considered a protegeé of Santora.

1935 births
1987 deaths
Genovese crime family
American gangsters of Italian descent